Slovak Republic has been a member of European Union since 2004. Slovakia has been an active participant in U.S.- and NATO-led military actions. There is a joint Czech-Slovak peacekeeping force in Kosovo. After the September 11, 2001 Terrorist Attack on the United States, the government opened its airspace to coalition planes. In June 2002, Slovakia announced that they would send an engineering brigade to Afghanistan.

Slovak Republic is a member of the United Nations and participates in its specialized agencies. It is a member of the Organization for Security and Cooperation in Europe (OSCE), the World Trade Organization (WTO), and the OECD. It also is part of the Visegrád Group (Slovakia, Hungary, Czech Republic, and Poland), a forum for discussing areas of common concern. Slovak Republic and the Czech Republic entered into a Customs Union upon the division of Czechoslovakia in 1993, which facilitates a relatively free flow of goods and services. Slovak Republic maintains diplomatic relations with 134 countries, primarily through its Ministry of Foreign Affairs. There are 44 embassies and 35 honorary consulates in Bratislava.

International disputes

Liechtenstein
Liechtenstein claims restitution of land in Slovakia confiscated from its princely family in 1918 by the then newly established state of Czechoslovakia, the predecessor of the Slovak Republic. The Slovak Republic insists that the power to claim restitution does not go back before February 1948, when the Communists seized power. Slovakia and Liechtenstein established diplomatic relations on 9 December 2009.

Hungary
Bilateral government, legal, technical and economic working group negotiations continued in 2006 between Slovakia and Hungary over Hungary's completion of its portion of the Gabcikovo-Nagymaros hydroelectric dam project along the Danube.

Multilateral agreements
In July 2022 after the Russian invasion of Ukraine the Prime Minister of Slovakia Eduard Heger made it known that he had entered discussions with the Czech Republic over the protection of Slovak airspace by Czech warplanes in the event that the Slovaks were to donate to the Ukraine the remnants of the Slovak MiG-29 fighter jet fleet, in advance of the fleet's replacement and renewal (at the earliest in 2023) by American F-16 warplanes. The transaction would also include the remnants of Slovakia's Soviet-era T-72 tanks. Czech PM Peter Fiala agreed with this initiative, which had been proposed by Ukrainian President Zelensky. The transaction was set to occur in September 2022.

International human rights criticism

Hong Kong national security law
In June 2020, Slovakia openly opposed the Hong Kong national security law.

Diplomatic relations

Bilateral relations

Africa

Americas

Asia

Europe

Oceania

See also
 List of diplomatic missions of Slovakia
 List of diplomatic missions in Slovakia
 Ministry of Foreign Affairs (Slovakia)

References